Dikeni-Rafid Salifou (born 8 June 2003) is a professional footballer who plays as a defensive midfielder for Werder Bremen. Born in Germany, he has opted to represent Togo internationally.

Club career
A youth product of FC Augsburg, Salifou transferred to Werder Bremen on 5 May 2022 signing a professional contract. He was initially assigned to the Werder Bremen reserves. He made his senior and professional debut with Werder Bremen as a late substitute in a 2–0 Bundesliga win over VfB Stuttgart on 5 February 2023.

International career
Born in Germany, Salifou is of Togolese descent. He was called up to represent the Togo national team in March 2022, but could not debut due to an injury.

Playing style
Salifou is a technical and athletic player, who can play as a defensive midfielder or as centre-back.

References

External links
 
 
 

2003 births
Living people
German people of Togolese descent
Togolese footballers
German footballers
Footballers from Munich
Association football midfielders
Bundesliga players
Regionalliga players
SV Werder Bremen players
SV Werder Bremen II players